Louis Patrick "Lou" Rowan (2 May 1925 – 3 February 2017) was an Australian Test cricket match umpire who umpired the first One Day International at the Melbourne Cricket Ground on 5 January 1971. He umpired 25 Test matches between 1963 and 1971 and became Australia's senior umpire after the retirement of Col Egar. As a Detective Sergeant with the Queensland drug squad, Rowan took no nonsense and was inclined to stand on his authority. His first match was with Umpire Bill Smyth between Australia and England at Sydney on 11 January to 15 January 1963.

1970/71 season 
Rowan umpired six of seven Test matches in the acrimonious 1970–71 Ashes series, but was heavily criticised by Ray Illingworth, Geoff Boycott and John Snow. After the series Boycott and Snow were called to a disciplinary hearing at Lord's over their behaviour, and Illingworth and Snow never toured again. In six full Tests no Australian batsman was given out lbw in the series, which in the minds of the England players was clear evidence of umpiring bias. It must be remembered that at the time umpires had no recourse to slow motion replays and had to make decisions based on what they saw in a split second, with the benefit of the doubt always going to the batsman. 

In the First Test Keith Stackpole should have been run out for 18 as Geoff Boycott threw down the wicket at the bowler's end, but Rowan gave the batsman the benefit of the doubt. The Australian papers carried photographs the next day showing that Stackpole was clearly out and labelled the decision "one of the worst in cricket history". Stackpole went on to make 207 – his highest Test score. Rowan's refusal to accept that his decision was wrong gave the England players grave doubts as to his ability and led them to question his judgements for the remainder of the series.

In the Second Test Ray Illingworth won the toss, but Rowan refused his request for the roller to be used on the wicket before play began. Rowan later realised his mistake and apologised in the lunch break. In the Australian first innings Keith Stackpole survived lbw appeals from Ken Shuttleworth and Peter Lever before he was out caught by Lever off Snow for 8. The England fast bowler John Snow wrote, "I have never come across another umpire so full of his own importance, so stubborn, lacking in humour, unreasonable and utterly unable to distinguish between a delivery short of a length which rises around the height of the rib cage and a genuine bouncer which goes through head high" and believed that chest high balls were not intimidatory. However, the great England umpire Dickie Bird wrote "as far as I am concerned, intimidatory bowling is the fast, short pitched ball into the region of the batsman's ribcage. When such a ball is fired in it is then that I feel an umpire must be firm...and tell the bowler to cut it out...that's the killer ball, and that is when I always step in". As Snow hit tailenders Garth McKenzie and Terry Jenner on the head in the series and continually bowled short at the other Australian batsmen it was not unreasonable for Rowan to intervene. Snow thought this was partisanship as Alan Thomson was not called to book when he bowled bouncers at Snow and six in one eight-ball over against Ray Illingworth. Snow was twice warned by Rowan for intimidatory bowling in the Second Test at Perth, but refused to accept that rib high balls were intimidatory and continued to bowl them. As a result, Snow was given an official warning, which meant that he would not be allowed to bowl if he was warned again. Illingworth told him that this was to be his last over in any case and the fast bowler sent his last ball flying over the head of Doug Walters, turned to Rowan and said, "Now that's a bouncer for you".

Even John Snow applauded when Rowan and Tom Brooks refused to start play at Melbourne in the abandoned Third Test. Ian Johnson and the Melbourne authorities were desperate to get the game going, but the umpires refused to be pressured as the field was quite unfit for play. A 40-over match was played, won by Australia by 5 wickets.  Rowan and Brooks thus became the first umpires to stand in a One Day International match.

In the Sixth Test Boycott was run out for 58, but vocally disputed his dismissal and later pointedly refused to apologise for his behaviour, which led to another press furore. However, on this occasion there was no clear evidence that Rowan's decision was incorrect.

The Seventh Test at Sydney on 12 February to 17 February 1971 was Rowan's last, with Tom Brooks as his umpiring colleague. It was a dramatic game won by England by 62 runs to regain The Ashes. Doug Walters had to be stumped twice by Alan Knott off Derek Underwood as he was given not out by Rowan the first time when on 41, but was a few balls later by Brooks for 42. After Keith Stackpole was caught off a thick edge by Knott off Peter Lever on 13, but was given not out by Rowan, the England captain Ray Illingworth said, "It was really unbelievable". Later in the innings Illingworth led the English players from the field following a crowd disturbance after John Snow had hit Australian lower-order batsman Terry Jenner on the head with a bouncer. Rowan had issued Snow with a warning for intimidatory bowling and Snow's and Illingworth's displeasure was clear to the crowd, who booed passionately.  When Snow finished his over and moved to his fielding position on the boundary, he was grabbed by a spectator, and had beer-cans thrown at him. Following the English walk-off, Rowan advised them to either resume or forfeit the match, and the players returned after the ground was cleared. In this Rowan was supported by the England manager David Clark and Alan Barnes of the A.B.C.

In 1972 Rowan wrote The Umpire's Story which was highly critical of the England team, particularly of Illingworth and Snow. It even queried, "Was John Snow actually grabbed by a spectator who objected to Snow flattening an Australian batsman?" regardless of photographic evidence to the contrary. John Snow in his autobiography Cricket Rebel devoted a whole chapter to "Bitter Rows with Umpire Rowan".

1971/72 season 
In 1971/72 season, a scheduled tour of Australia by South Africa was cancelled following political and moral protests against the apartheid policies of the South African government.  In its place a ‘World Team’ visited Australia and played a series of Test standard, although never officially recognised.  Rowan stood in three of these matches, including the match at Perth where Dennis Lillee took 8/29 in an innings.

See also
 List of Test cricket umpires
 List of One Day International cricket umpires

References

 Pollard, Jack, Australian Cricket: 1948-1995, The Packer Years. Sydney, The Book Company, 1995.
 Rowan, Lou, The Umpire’s Story: with an analysis of the laws of cricket, Sydney, Jack Pollard, 1972. 

External links
 

1925 births
2017 deaths
Australian police officers
Australian Test cricket umpires
Australian One Day International cricket umpires